
Year 359 BC was a year of the pre-Julian Roman calendar. At the time, it was known as the Year of the Consulship of Laenas and Imperiosus (or, less frequently, year 395 Ab urbe condita). The denomination 359 BC for this year has been used since the early medieval period, when the Anno Domini calendar era became the prevalent method in Europe for naming years.

Events 
 By place 
 Macedonia 
 The Macedonian King Perdiccas III is killed while defending his country against an Illyrian attack led by King Bardylis. He is succeeded by his infant son, Amyntas IV. The child's uncle, Philip II, assumes the regency.
The Illyrians prepare to close in, the Paeonians raid from the north and two claimants to the Macedonian throne are supported by foreign powers. Philip II buys off his dangerous neighbours and, with a treaty, cedes Amphipolis to Athens.

Births 
 Philip III of Macedon, brother and successor of Alexander the Great (approximate date) (d. 317 BC)

Deaths 
 Perdiccas III, king of Macedonia

References